Heinrich Ernst Otto "Henner" Henkel (9 October 1915 – 13 January 1943) was a German tennis player during the 1930s. His biggest success was his singles title at the 1937 French Championships.

Biography 

Henner was born in 1915 the son of Ferdinand and Margarete Henkel. After World War I, his family moved to Erfurt in 1919. He joined the Sportclub Erfurt (today TC Erfurt 93) together with his elder brother Ferdinand and learned to play tennis. His father moved to Berlin for job-related reasons, and his entire family followed in 1927.

In 1929, Henkel won the club championships of the THC 99 Berlin. In 1932 and 1933, he won the German junior championships. In singles he was defeated by Ladislav Hecht at the 1934 Hungarian International Tennis Championships in the final.

Henkel was the second German, after Gottfried von Cramm in 1936, to win the singles title at the French Championships in 1937. The same year, he and Gottfried von Cramm won the Roland Garros doubles title. Later that year they also won the US Championships doubles title defeating Americans Don Budge and Gene Mako in three straight sets.

In March 1937 he became the singles champion at the Cairo International Championships defeating Giorgio de Stefani in the final in straight sets and also won the doubles title partnering Von Cramm. Later that year he won the singles title at the German Championships after a five-sets victory in the final over Vivian McGrath. Two years later, in 1939, he again won the title after defeating Roderich Menzel in the final in four sets.

Between 1934 and 1939 Henkel played 66 matches for the German Davis Cup team in 27 ties. He won 49 matches, lost 17 and was particularly successful in doubles, winning 16 of 20 matches partnering Gottfried von Cramm, Georg von Metaxa and Roderich Menzel.

Henkel played his last tournament at Bad Pyrmont in the summer of 1942. He reached the final which he lost to Roderich Menzel. During the tournament, he had already received his draft notice. In the Battle of Stalingrad, Henkel was shot in the upper leg. He died of this injury on 13 January 1943 near Voronezh.

Since 1950 the German junior team championship has been called the "Große Henner Henkel-Spiele" and since 1963 a commemorative tournament, "Henner-Henkel-Gedächtnisturnier", has been held in Erfurt.

Grand Slam finals

Singles (1 title)

Doubles (2 titles, 2 runners-up)

Mixed doubles (1 runner-up)

References

External links 
 
 
 

1915 births
1943 deaths
Sportspeople from Poznań
People from the Province of Posen
French Championships (tennis) champions
German Army personnel killed in World War II
Deaths by firearm in the Soviet Union
German male tennis players
Tennis players from Berlin
United States National champions (tennis)
Grand Slam (tennis) champions in men's singles
Grand Slam (tennis) champions in men's doubles
Deaths by firearm in Russia